The Ministry of Agriculture and Livestock  is a Guinean ministry. The incumbent is currently Mamadou Nagnalen Barry.

Officeholders since 2010

References 

https://www.agriculture.gov.gn/ (in French)

Politics of Guinea
Agriculture ministries
Government ministries of Guinea
Agriculture in Guinea
Agricultural organizations based in Africa